The Golden Rooster for Best Actor (中国电影金鸡奖最佳男主角) is one of the main categories of competition of the Golden Rooster Awards. It is awarded to leading male actor(s) who have outstanding performance in motion pictures.

Award Winners & Nominees

1980s

1990s

2000s

2010s

2020s

References

Golden Rooster, Best Actor
Actor, Best
Film awards for lead actor